Donata Abdra Sofia Katai (born 7 May 2004) is a Zimbabwean swimmer. She competed in the women's 100 metre backstroke at the 2020 Summer Olympics. Katai was the first black swimmer to represent Zimbabwe at the Olympics.

Born in Harare, she is of Italian and Ndebele descent through her father and Scottish and Shona descent through her mother.

References

External links

2004 births
Living people
Zimbabwean female backstroke swimmers
Olympic swimmers of Zimbabwe
Swimmers at the 2020 Summer Olympics
Sportspeople from Harare
Zimbabwean people of Italian descent
Zimbabwean people of Scottish descent